Elizabeth Busche (September 12, 1992 – May 3, 2012) was an American curler from Duluth, Minnesota.

Curling career
Busche started curling in 2001, but played third for Cory Christensen's junior team in 2011. They were Minnesota state runners up in 2011 and 2012, thus represented "Minnesota 2" at both the 2011 and 2012 United States Junior Curling Championships. The team won the 2012 Championship, qualifying them to represent the United States at the 2012 World Junior Curling Championships. The team finished last in the tournament, with a 0–9 record.

In addition to her junior accolades, Busche was also a member of the 2011 Minnesota State Mixed championship team that finished 5th at the 2011 US Mixed Championship.

Death
Busche died just two months after the 2012 World Juniors from a rare form of ovarian cancer.

References

External links
 United States Curling Association profile
 

1992 births
2012 deaths
Sportspeople from Duluth, Minnesota
American female curlers
21st-century American women